Tomoxia bucephala is a species of beetle in the genus Tomoxia of the family Mordellidae. It was redescribed by Achille Costa in 1854.

References

Beetles described in 1854
Tomoxia
Taxa named by Achille Costa